Agostoni is an Italian surname. Notable people with the surname include:

Carlo Agostoni (1909–1972), Italian fencer
Silvana Agostoni, Mexican-Italian visual artist
Ugo Agostoni (1893–1941), Italian cyclist

See also
Agostini
Agostino (name)

Italian-language surnames
Patronymic surnames
Surnames from given names